The Soccer NSW 2000 season was the 44th season of football in New South Wales since the formation of NSW Federation of Soccer Clubs in 1957. It was the ninth and final time the premier division was named the "Super League" and the second division was named "Division One". There were 26 teams competing across both divisions, with 14 teams in the Super League and 12 teams in Division One. At the end of the season the Super League was rebranded as the NSW Premier League and played over the summer months and began in late 2000. This was so that it would be aligned with the National Soccer League. Division One was renamed the NSW Winter Super League and began in 2001.

Competitions

2000 Super League

The 2000 Super League season was played over 26 rounds, with the regular season from January to July 2000.

League table

Finals

2000 NSW Division One

The 2000 NSW Division One season was played over 22 rounds.

League table

Finals
Results unknown. Dulwich Hill won but were not promoted for the following season.

References

2000 in Australian soccer